DBGallery, an abbreviation of Database Gallery, is a Digital Asset Management cloud service (SaaS) and on-prem webserver for a range of team sizes.

Use DBGallery to centrally store, manage, catalogue, archive and securely share your image, video, and document files, keep track of different versions and detect duplicates. Its intuitive and advanced search capabilities place assets at everyone's fingertips.  Workflow, version control, activity logs and other team features provide a collaborative environment for those inside and outside an organization.

History
DBGallery's first public release was December 2007. Since then each year has seen continuous enhancements.  2013 added support for additional non-English languages in its meta-data.  2014 added support for creating custom data fields for tagging and search.  2015 included the ability to auto-tag images using Reverse Geocoding. 2018 added artificial intelligence (AI) image recognition as a further addition to auto-tagging. March 2020 added complete image collection management via the web (e.g. file and folder drag and drop), a new collection dashboard, custom data layouts, and an improved audit trail.  2021 has seen user experience improvements provided by improved styling and performance enhancements.

Version 12 was released in October 2021.  It added the ability to upload unlimited file sizes and made significant performance improvements for very large collections.  June 2022 saw the release of a global duplicate images search. In late 2022 DBGallery began offering significantly reduced cloud storage cost, at a third of its previous prices, which played into its recent high-volume/high-capacity capabilities and its clients' subsequent demand for additional storage.

References

External links
 Official Website
 YouTube Channel

Image organizers
Cloud computing providers
Cloud applications
Application software
Photo software